Sanigaram Santosh Reddy (born 12 November 1942), more commonly known as Santanna, Santosh Reddy, Mrudhu Swabhavi, Pedala Pennidhi by his followers, is an Indian politician and former minister of Telangana state.
He is also related to Late Sri Muduganti Ramgopal Reddy ex. MP (1971 to 1984) and took him as an inspiration to be a leader.

Family background and education
Reddy was born into a middle-class family at Muchkuru village of Nizamabad District, Telangana. He graduated Bachelor of Arts from the Giriraj government College Nizamabad, Osmania University Andhra Pradesh.

Political career

Entry into politics
He was attracted to politics during his college days and he was influenced by the then socialist leaders Late. Sri Muduganti Ramgopal Reddy, Late. Sri. G. Rajaram and BR Ganga Reddy of Nizamabad district. He was elected as General Secretary in 1964–65 and as President in 1966–67 of Giriraj Government College, Nizamabad. Later he was elected as Grampanchayath Member of Muchkur village in 1970. He was appointed district youth congress President Nizamabad in 1971 and elected as General Secretary for Nizamabad Beedi Mazdur Sangh, Nizamabad. He worked as State Council Member, Andhra Pradesh Youth Congress Committee in 1975. He joined YSR congress party.

Member of legislative assembly
In 1978, Reddy was elected as Member of Legislative Assembly (MLA), Andhra Pradesh from Armoor constituency along with former Chief Minister Dr. Y. S. Raja Sekhara Reddy and former Chief Minister Mr. Nara Chandra Babu Naidu. He was elected as (MLA) for the second time in the wave of then film star NT Rama Rao in 1983. He was elected for the third time as (MLA) in 1989. And he was elected as (MLA) for the fourth time in 2004 (TRS).

State minister
Reddy worked as Minister for Roads & Buildings in 1990–1991 and then Finance Minister in 1991–1992 in the Nedurimalli Janardhan Reddy's Cabinet. And in 1992–1993 he worked as Minister for Major Industries in the Kotla Vijaya Bhasker Reddy's Cabinet. Later he worked as Minister for Transport in Dr. Y. S. Rajasekhara Reddy's Cabinet in 2004–2005.

Acting career

In 1991 Reddy acted as Speaker role in the Telugu film Thegimpu. He also acted as a poet in a video movie Andhra Vaibhavam.

Personal life

Santosh Reddy is having a son Shanigaram Srinivas Reddy (Vasu Babu), who lives in the USA, has entered active politics. He is the presumptive Congress candidate from Armoor for the 2009 general elections.

External links
 http://www.sanigaram.com/
 
 http://www.rediff.com/election/ap04detail.htm
 http://www.mastindia.com/ap_sheet.htm
 http://www.euroandhra.com/Profiles/Council.html
 sify.com

1942 births
Living people
People from Telangana
Telangana politicians